British Library, Add MS 14466 is a Syriac manuscript of the New Testament, according to Peshitta version, on parchment. Palaeographically it has been assigned to the 10 or 11th century.

Description 

It contains the fragments of the Gospel of Mark (6:18-33; 9:31-10:19) and Gospel of Luke (1:61-2:22), according to Peshitta version, on 7 vellum leaves (6 ½ by 4 ¾ inches). Written in one column per page, in 21-23 lines per page. The writing is neat and regular. The lessons are rubricated on the margin by prima manu.

The manuscript is housed at the British Library (Add MS 14466, folios 11-17) in London.

See also 

 List of the Syriac New Testament manuscripts
 Syriac versions of the Bible
 Biblical manuscript
 British Library, Add MS 14455
 British Library, Add MS 14459
 British Library, Add MS 14467
 Syriac New Testament (British Library, Add MS 14479)

References

Further reading 

 William Wright, Catalogue of the Syriac manuscripts in the British Museum (1870, reprint: Gorgias Press 2002), p.67.

Peshitta manuscripts
10th-century biblical manuscripts
11th-century biblical manuscripts
Add. 14466